Federal Project Number One, also referred to as Federal One, is the collective name for a group of projects under the Works Progress Administration, a New Deal program in the United States. Of the $4.88 billion allocated by the Emergency Relief Appropriation Act of 1935, $27 million was approved for the employment of artists, musicians, actors and writers under the WPA's Federal Project Number One. In its prime, Federal Project Number One employed up to 40,000 writers, musicians, artists and actors because, as Secretary of Commerce Harry Hopkins put it, "Hell, they’ve got to eat, too". This project had two main principles: 1) that in time of need the artist, no less than the manual worker, is entitled to employment as an artist at the public expense and 2) that the arts, no less than business, agriculture, and labor, are and should be the immediate concern of the ideal commonwealth.

The five divisions of Federal One were these:

Federal Art Project
Federal Music Project
Federal Theatre Project
Federal Writers' Project 
Historical Records Survey (originally part of the Federal Writers' Project)

All projects were supposed to operate without discrimination regarding race, creed, color, religion, or political affiliation.

Federal Project Number One ended in 1939 when, under pressure from Congress, the theater project was cancelled and the other projects were required to rely on state funding and local sponsorship.

Controversy 
Many people were opposed to government involvement in the arts. They feared that government funding and influence would lead to censorship and a violation of freedom of speech. Members of the House Un-American Activities Committee  believed the program to be infiltrated by communists.

However, with support from Eleanor Roosevelt, Franklin Roosevelt signed the executive order to create this project because the government wanted to support, as Fortune magazine stated, “the kind of raw cultural material—the raw material of new creative work—which is so necessary to artists and particularly to artists in a new country.”

Legacy 

As previously mentioned, at its peak Federal One employed 40,000 writers, musicians, artists and actors and the Federal Writers' project had around 6,500 people on the WPA payroll. Many people benefitted from these programs and some FWP writers became famous, such as John Steinbeck and Zora Neale Hurston. These writers were considered to be federal writers. Furthermore, these projects also published books such as New York Panorama and the WPA Guide to New York City.

See also
Mathematical Tables Project
Harry Hopkins
New Deal

References

External links
National Archives and Records Administration: A New Deal for the Arts
New Deal Cultural Programs: Experiments in Cultural Democracy
Federal Project Number One The Eleanor Roosevelt Papers Project, George Washington University
McCausland, Elizabeth, "Save the Arts Projects," The Nation, July 17, 1937.

New Deal projects of the arts
Works Progress Administration
Public art in the United States